Detunized Gravity is the first album of De-Phazz, which was released in 1997.

Track listing 

De-Phazz albums
1997 albums